Boogie Down U.S.A. is the debut studio album recorded by American funk band The People's Choice, released in 1975 on the TSOP label.

Chart performance
The album peaked at No. 7 on the R&B albums chart. It also reached No. 56 on the Billboard 200. The album features the single, "Do It Any Way You Wanna", which peaked at No. 1 on the Hot Soul Singles chart and No. 11 on the Billboard Hot 100. "Nursery Rhymes" also charted at No. 22 on the Hot Soul Singles chart and No. 93 on the Billboard Hot 100.

Track listing

Personnel
People's Choice
Frankie Brunson – lead vocals, keyboards
David Thompson – percussion
Roger Andrews – bass
Guy Fiske – guitar

Additional Musicians/Personnel
Leno Zachery – saxophone
MFSB – horns
Bobby Eli, Norman Harris – guitar
Victor Carstarphen – organ

References

External links
 

1975 debut albums
The People's Choice (band) albums
Albums produced by Kenneth Gamble
Albums produced by Leon Huff
Albums arranged by Bobby Martin
Albums recorded at Sigma Sound Studios
TSOP Records albums